The Roman Catholic Metropolitan Archdiocese of Panamá (erected 28 August 1513 as the Diocese of Santa María de La Antigua del Darién) is a Metropolitan Archdiocese, and its suffragan dioceses include Chitré, Colón-Kuna Yala, David, Penonomé and Santiago de Veraguas, as well as the Territorial Prelature of Bocas del Toro. The Diocese of Santa María de La Antigua del Darién was originally located upriver from the mouth of the Atrato River on the Gulf of Urabá in the Castilla de Oro province. 
The see was moved to Panama City and renamed as the Diocese of Panamá on 7 December 1520 and elevated to an archdiocese on 29 November 1925. The current Metropolitan Archbishop of Panama is Archbishop Jose Domingo Ulloa Mendieta, O.S.A.

Bishops

Ordinaries

Diocese of Santa María de La Antigua del Darién
Erected August 28, 1513 
Juan de Quevedo Villegas, O.F.M. (1513–1519)

Diocese of Panamá

Archdiocese of Panamá
Elevated: 29 November 1925
Juan José Maíztegui y Besoitaiturria, C.M.F. (1933–1943)
Francisco Beckmann, C.M.F. (1945–1963)
Tomas Alberto Clavel Méndez (1964–1968)
Marcos Gregorio McGrath, C.S.C. (1969–1994)
José Dimas Cedeño Delgado (1994–2010); Archbishop Emeritus
Jose Domingo Ulloa Mendieta, O.S.A. (2010–present)

Coadjutor bishop
Juan Francisco del Rosario Manfredo y Ballestas (1845-1847)

Auxiliary bishops
Juan José Maíztegui y Besoitaiturria, C.M.F. (1932-1933), appointed Archbishop here
Francisco Beckmann, C.M. (1940-1945), appointed Archbishop here
Marcos Gregorio McGrath, C.S.C. (1961-1964), appointed Bishop of Santiago de Veraguas (later returned here as Archbishop0
Carlos Ambrosio Lewis Tullock, S.V.D. (1965-1986), appointed Coadjutor Bishop of David
José Luis Lacunza Maestrojuán, O.A.R. (1985-1994), appointed Bishop of Chitré; future Cardinal
Oscar Mario Brown Jiménez (1985-1994), appointed Bishop of Santiago de Veraguas
Fernando Torres Durán (1996-1999), appointed Bishop of Chitré
José Domingo Ulloa Mendieta, O.S.A. (2004-2010), appointed Archbishop here
Pablo Varela Server (2004-2019)
Uriah Adolphus Ashley Maclean (2015-2019)

Other priests of this diocese who became bishops
José María Carrizo Villarreal, appointed Bishop of Chitré in 1963
Rafael Valdivieso Miranda, appointed Bishop of Chitré in 2013

Current Bishops
Archbishop : Jose Domingo Ulloa Mendieta, O.S.A.

Territorial losses

See also
Catholic Church in Panama

References

External links
Arquidiócesis de Panamá  official site (in Spanish)
 

Roman Catholic dioceses in Panama
Religious organizations established in the 1510s
1513 establishments in the Spanish Empire
Roman Catholic dioceses established in the 16th century
A